Living Lahaina is an American reality television series on MTV. The series, filmed over a three-month period on location in Lahaina (on the island of Maui, Hawaii), focused on a group of twenty-something surf instructors and their father-figure-boss at the Royal Hawaiian Surf Academy.  Living Lahaina also followed cast members throughout travels to Indonesia, California, and Kauai.

Living Lahaina premiered on April 17, 2007 on MTV and was scheduled to run for eight episodes.  However, only 3 episodes were shown on MTV.

Following the style of MTV's Laguna Beach: The Real Orange County, The Hills, and Maui Fever, Living Lahaina was shot in the format of a scripted television show (rather than in the style of a traditional reality show or documentary).  Cast members did not speak directly to the camera.  Instead, the show made use of a Dukes of Hazzard style voice-over narrative periodically throughout each episode, to give background or sum up storylines.

Episodes

See also
Maui Fever

References 

2000s American reality television series
2007 American television series debuts
2007 American television series endings
Television shows set in Hawaii
MTV original programming
Lahaina, Hawaii
Television shows filmed in Hawaii